The following is a list of political career biographies. It is meant to complement the list of political memoirs page, with the key difference being that the books in this list are authored by persons other than the book's subject.  This list is sorted by country and by the political position and last name of the book's subject:

Australia 
Richard Casey: Minister for Foreign Affairs 1951-1960
R G Casey, Australian Foreign Minister, Collins 1972
Ben Chifley: Prime Minister 1945-1949
Ben Chifley, Things Worth Fighting For, Melbourne University Press, 1952
Sir Robert Menzies: Prime Minister 1939-1941; 1949-1966
R. G. Menzies, Afternoon Light, Cassell & Co., London, 1967
Graham Richardson: Senator 1983-1994
Graham Richardson, Whatever It Takes (Bantam, 1994)
Gough Whitlam: Prime Minister 1972-1975
Gough Whitlam, The Whitlam Government, Penguin, 1985

United Kingdom

Karl Marx: Writer 1818-1883
Karl Marx: His Life and Environment (1939) by Isaiah Berlin
Karl Marx: The Story of His Life (1918) by Franz Mehring
Karl Marx: His Life and Thought (1973) by David McLellan

United States

U.S. Cabinet 
Albright, Madeleine: Secretary of State under President Bill Clinton, 1997-2001 
Madeleine Albright : A Twentieth-Century Odyssey (2000) by Michael Dobbs

Brown, Ron: Secretary of Commerce under President Bill Clinton, 1993-1996
Ron Brown: An Uncommon Life (2001) by Steven A. Holmes

Byrnes, James F.: Secretary of State under President Harry Truman, 1945-1947 
Sly and Able: A Political Biography of James F. Byrnes (1994) by David Robertson

Connally, John: Secretary of the Treasury under President Richard Nixon, 1971-1972 
The Lone Star: The Life of John Connally (1989) by James Reston Jr.

Dulles, John Foster: Secretary of Defense under President Dwight D. Eisenhower, 1953-1959 
Power and Peace: The Diplomacy of John Foster Dulles (1995) by Frederick Marks
John Foster Dulles: Piety, Pragmatism, and Power in U.S. Foreign Policy (1998) by Richard H. Immerman

Forrestal, James: Secretary of Defense under President Harry Truman, 1947-1949
Driven Patriot : The Life and Times of James Forrestal (1992) by Townsend Hoopes

Johnson, Louis: Secretary of Defense under President Harry Truman, 1949-1950 
Louis Johnson And the Arming of America: The Roosevelt And Truman Years (2005) by Keith D. McFarland and David L. Roll

Kissinger, Henry: Secretary of State under Presidents Richard Nixon and Gerald Ford, 1973-1977
Kissinger Transcripts: The Top Secret Talks With Beijing and Moscow (1999) by William Burr
The Flawed Architect : Henry Kissinger and American Foreign Policy (2004) by Jussi M. Hanhimaki
The Price of Power: Kissinger in the Nixon White House (1983) by Seymour M. Hersh
Sideshow, Revised Edition : Kissinger, Nixon, and the Destruction of Cambodia (2002) by William Shawcross
The Nixon-Kissinger Years: Reshaping of America's Foreign Policy (1989) by Richard C. Thornton

Marshall, George C.: Secretary of State, 1947-1949, and Secretary of Defense, 1950-1951, under President Harry Truman 
George C. Marshall: Statesman 1945-1959 (1987) by Forrest Pogue

McNamara, Robert: Secretary of Defense under Presidents John F. Kennedy and Lyndon B. Johnson, 1961-1968 
Promise and Power: The Life and Times of Robert McNamara (1993) by Deborah Shapely	

O'Neill, Paul: Secretary of the Treasury under President George W. Bush, 2001-2002 
The Price of Loyalty: George W. Bush, the White House, and the Education of Paul O'Neill (2004) by Ron Suskind

Rumsfeld, Donald: Secretary of Defense under President George W. Bush, 2001–present 
Rumsfeld's War: The Untold Story of America's Anti-Terrorist Commander (2004) by Rowan Scarborough

Vance, Cyrus: Secretary of State under President Jimmy Carter, 1977-1980		
Cyrus Vance (1985) by David S. McLellan

U.S. Supreme Court 
Blackmun, Harry: 98th Supreme Court Justice, 1970-1994 
Becoming Justice Blackmun: Harry Blackmun's Supreme Court Journey (2005) by Linda Greenhouse

Marshall, Thurgood: 96th Supreme Court Justice, 1967-1991 
Thurgood Marshall: Justice for All (1992) by Roger Goldman and David Gallen
Dream Makers, Dream Breakers: The World of Justice Thurgood Marshall (1993) by Carl T. Rowan
Thurgood Marshall : American Revolutionary (2000) by Juan Williams

O'Connor, Sandra Day: 102nd Supreme Court Justice, 1981-2006
Sandra Day O'Connor : How the First Woman on the Supreme Court Became Its Most Influential Justice (2005) by Joan Biskupic

Scalia, Antonin: 103rd Supreme Court Justice, 1986–present
Justice Antonin Scalia and the Conservative Revival (1998) by Richard A. Brisbin Jr.
Scalia Dissents : Writings of the Supreme Court's Wittiest, Most Outspoken Justice (2004) by Kevin A. Ring
 American Original:  The Life and Constitution of Supreme Court Justice Antonin Scalia (2009) by Joan Biskupic

Souter, David: 105th Supreme Court Justice, 1990–present
David Hackett Souter: Traditional Republican On The Rehnquist Court (2005) by Tinsley E. Yarbrough

Thomas, Clarence: 106th Supreme Court Justice, 1991–present
The Prince and the Pauper: The Case Against Clarence Thomas, Associate Justice of the U.S. Supreme Court (2001) by John L. Cooper and Armin Cooper
Judging Thomas : The Life and Times of Clarence Thomas (2004) by Ken Foskett	
Supreme Discomfort : The Divided Soul of Clarence Thomas (2006) by Kevin Merida and Michael Fletcher
Clarence Thomas: A Biography (2001) by Andrew Peyton Thomas

See also 
 List of American political memoirs
 List of Australian political memoirs

Political bibliographies